Blacks may refer to:

 Blacks (Canada)
 All Blacks, New Zealand rugby union team
 Black people
 Blacks Leisure Group, owner of Blacks and Millets in the United Kingdom
 The Blacks (play), a play by Jean Genet
 Blacks Photo Corporation, or Blacks, a defunct photography store chain
 Zamora, California, formerly called Blacks

See also
 The Blacks (disambiguation)
 Black's (disambiguation)
 Black (disambiguation)